The Minister of State to the Government was a junior ministerial post of the Government of Ireland between 1994 and 2002. The Minister of State did not hold cabinet rank but sat in attendance at government meetings without a vote. The position previously existed as the Parliamentary Secretary to the Executive Council from 1922 to 1926, and as Parliamentary Secretary to the Government from 1951 to 1957.

List of office-holders

References

Government